Schoeneck is a toponym of German origin, meaning "beautiful corner". It may refer to:

People
Charles A. Schoeneck, Jr. (1912–1989), New York politician
Charles C. Schoeneck, New York assemblyman in 1898 and 1899, see 121st New York State Legislature
Edward Schoeneck (1875–1951), Lieutenant Governor of New York
Jumbo Schoeneck (1862–1930), American baseball player

Places
Schoeneck, Pennsylvania
Schœneck, town in France

See also
Schöneck (disambiguation)